John Travolta Wannabe is the second extended play by South Korean girl group T-ara. The EP's repackage edition is called Roly-Poly in Copacabana and it was released as a limited edition on August 2, 2011.

History
It was announced on June 8, 2011 that T-ara would make a comeback in July with John Travolta Wannabe. It was also revealed that the lead single was composed by Shinsadong Tiger and Choi Gyu Sung, who had previously worked with T-ara on songs like "Bo Peep Bo Peep".<ref name="Nate">{{cite web|url=http://news.nate.com/view/20110608n10323|title=티아라, 일본 진출 전 BoPeep BoPeepII'로 7월1일 컴백}}</ref> T-ara came up with the concept themselves after watching Saturday Night Fever.

On June 24, Core Contents Media released a 59-second teaser of T-ara's title track "Roly-Poly". The video was released three days earlier than originally scheduled, due to the request of fans. The full 12.5-minute music video was released on June 28. Musically, "Roly-Poly" was considered a remake of the Bee Gees' "Night Fever", and the video's choreography was called reminiscent of Saturday Night Fever, which starred John Travolta.

Chart performance
In August 2011, "Roly-Poly" had become the top-grossing song of the year until that point with over $2 million in sales.

On the Gaon Yearly 2011 Download chart, "Roly-Poly" was the best-selling song in South Korea with over 4,077,885 downloads.

Both albums charted on the Gaon Yearly 2011 Album chart, with John Travolta Wannabe selling 30,116 copies and the repackage Roly Poly in Copacabana sold 24,179 copies.

Re-release
On August 1, Core Contents Media announced that a repackage of John Travolta Wannabe would be titled Roly-Poly in Copacabana'' and limited to only 10,000 copies. The repackage contains one new song, a Eurodance remix of "Roly-Poly" titled "Roly-Poly in Copacabana", which was named after the famous 1980s disco club. The song premiered on August 2 while the music video was delayed until the next day. The revealing of "Roly-Poly in Copacabana" was pushed up an hour than originally planned, due to the urging of fans.

Track listing

Roly-Poly in Copacabana

Charts

John Travolta Wannabe

Roly Poly in Copacabana

Sales

Accolades

Awards and nominations

Rankings

Release history

References

2011 albums
T-ara albums
Kakao M EPs
Korean-language EPs